Thomas Kwaku Mensah (2 February 1935 – 10 April 2016) was the Roman Catholic archbishop of the Archdiocese of Kumasi, Ghana.

Ordained to the priesthood on  3 June 1973. Mensah was consecrated Bishop of Obuasi on 28 May 1995, enthroned Archbishop on 26 March 2008 and retired on 15 May 2012.

References 

1935 births
2016 deaths
Ghanaian Roman Catholic archbishops
20th-century Roman Catholic bishops in Ghana
Roman Catholic bishops of Obuasi
Roman Catholic archbishops of Kumasi